Sedenia mesochorda is a moth in the family Crambidae. It is found in Australia, where it has been recorded from Victoria.

The wings are whitish, densely suffused with pale fuscous. There is a median whitish streak from the base to the end of the cell. The hindwings are whitish, faintly suffused with fuscous along the apical portion of the termen.

References

Moths described in 1917
Spilomelinae